Kaitlyn Helena Howard (born July 23, 1998) is an American actress. She is known for her breakout role in Josephine Decker's film Madeline's Madeline, which was hailed by IndieWire as one of the 50 best performances of the 2010s decade and 2nd in The New Yorker's list of the 50 best film performances of the 21st century.

Early life
Howard was born on July 23, 1998, in New York City, New York. Her parents, both artists, are Julia Binet and Will Howard. Her mother is of Scandinavian and Eastern European descent, and her father is African American of mixed descent. She has a younger brother, Liam. Howard grew up in the New Jersey area, and attended the Union County Academy for Performing Arts.

Career
After she was discovered by Josephine Decker in 2014 at the Union County Teen Arts Festival, where Decker was a judge, Howard starred in her critically acclaimed feature film Madeline's Madeline. This was Howard's screen debut and she played the titular role.

Howard was one of the participants of the festival, and recited a monologue from Blackbird by David Harrower. When she finished, Decker said of Howard's performance that it was "the best she had seen" in her life, and both of them started crying. After the show ended, Decker and Howard exchanged some information, and met up a month or so later; Howard ultimately helped develop the story of the film through several improvisation workshops with Decker and others.

The film had its world premiere at the Sundance Film Festival on January 22, 2018. It was released on August 10, 2018, by Oscilloscope Laboratories. The film received critical acclaim, particularly for Howard's performance, which IndieWire hailed as one of the 50 best performances of the 2010s.

Howard's next role was in the short film Twist, which had its world premiere at the 2019 Tribeca Film Festival. She stars as Nora Reid in Amazon's The Wilds. Howard also appeared as Cleo in the film Shoplifters of the World.

Filmography

Film and television

Awards and nominations

References

External links
 

1998 births
21st-century American actresses
Actresses from New York City
African-American actresses
American film actresses
Living people
21st-century African-American women
21st-century African-American people